Zemacies climacota is an extinct species of sea snail, a marine gastropod mollusk in the family Borsoniidae.

Description

Distribution
This extinct marine species is endemic to New Zealand and was found in Lower Miocene strata.

References

 Suter, Henry. Descriptions of New Tertiary Mollusca Occurring in New Zealand Part I. 1917.
 Maxwell, P.A. (2009). Cenozoic Mollusca. pp. 232–254 in Gordon, D.P. (ed.) New Zealand inventory of biodiversity. Volume one. Kingdom Animalia: Radiata, Lophotrochozoa, Deuterostomia. Canterbury University Press, Christchurch.

climacota
Gastropods of New Zealand
Gastropods described in 1917